Aviation Survival Technician (AST) is a rating or job specialty in the United States Coast Guard.  Rescue swimmer is the collateral duty or aircrew position of the AST. They are trained at the U.S. Coast Guard's enlisted Aviation Survival Technician/Rescue Swimmer school at Coast Guard Aviation Technical Training Center, Coast Guard Air Station Elizabeth City in Elizabeth City, North Carolina.

History
The rating began in 1968 when the U.S. Coast Guard combined Parachute Rigger (PR) and Aviation Ordnanceman (AO) to create the Aviation Survivalman (ASM) Rating. In 1983, the  disaster of the  spawned a Congressional Inquiry that found the USCG was the only military service unable to deploy a member from an aircraft for search, rescue and recovery, and initiated a legal requirement for the armed force to do so. After much internal debate, the collateral duty of "Helicopter Rescue Swimmer" was issued to the ASM rating. Initially met with significant resistance throughout the USCG, the AST has become a durable and required part of Coast Guard rotary wing operations.

Initially, all new ASMs were required to complete US Navy Helicopter Rescue Swimmer school at Naval Air Station Pensacola, Florida, prior to reporting to USCG ASM "A" School and EMT "C" School. After a few years, the differences between what the candidates were learning in the combat-oriented Navy school and what was being required of them during civilian rescues required an organic Coast Guard helicopter rescue swimmer school to be begun. An aquatic segment of training was merged into ASM "A" school in the late 1980s, and full initial rescue swimmer training was completed at the USCG's Elizabeth City training center.  

In 1999, along with the realignment of enlisted aviation rates throughout the USCG, the Aviation Survivalman rating was redesignated to Aviation Survival Technician.

In 2014, a state of the art training center was opened under the command of the Aviation Technical Training Center aboard BASE Elizabeth City, NC and houses AST "A" School as well as Underwater Egress "C" School.

Training and qualification
The course is 24 weeks long. The course includes instruction on rescue techniques, helicopter deployment techniques, and myriad technical skills from small engine repair to parachute packing and maintenance. Successful completion of this course results in being awarded the Aviation Survival Technician rating, the technical rating for a variety of aircraft and survival equipment maintenance. 

After completion of A-School, all ASTs are sent to Training Center Petaluma, California to attend the Coast Guard's Emergency Medical Technician school.  After seven weeks of EMT training, they must take and pass the National Registry of Emergency Medical Technicians-Basic (NREMT-B) test as part of their qualification as a helicopter rescue swimmer.

Full qualification as a rescue swimmer can take up to a year from graduation of A-School, as graduates must learn the aircraft systems and emergency procedures of their assigned aircraft.  

Not all ASTs serve as rotary wing helicopter rescue swimmers. Many serve in other roles, including as aircrew on fixed-wing assets, at Coast Guard fire departments and as instructors at any of the various training commands.

Pop culture
The 2006 movie The Guardian featured Kevin Costner and Ashton Kutcher as well as a number of actual ASTs and Coast Guardsmen as extras, and told a fictional story of two rescue swimmers. 

In 2019, the Amazon Prime reboot of Jack Ryan featured a helicopter rescue swimmer in the pilot episode.

See also
 Air-sea rescue
 Naval aircrewman
 United States Air Force Pararescue
 Parachute Rigger
 Aviation Ordnanceman

References

External links
 USCG AST duty description
 "Coast Guard School Tough Swimming, Few Pass Rescue Course"
 IMO Awards for Exceptional Bravery at Sea 2013 go to American rescuers and a Chinese seafarer

Rescue aviation
United States Coast Guard Aviation
United States Coast Guard job titles